Philothamnus natalensis, commonly known as the Natal green snake, is a species of snakes in the family Colubridae. The species is found in South Africa, Eswatini, Mozambique and Zimbabwe. Philothamnus occidentalis was previously considered a subspecies.

References

Colubrids
Snakes of Africa
Reptiles of Eswatini
Reptiles of Mozambique
Reptiles of South Africa
Reptiles of Zimbabwe
Reptiles described in 1848
Taxa named by Andrew Smith (zoologist)